Hong Hyun-hee (born 24 January 1982) is a South Korean former basketball player who competed in the 2004 Summer Olympics.

References

External links

1982 births
Living people
South Korean women's basketball players
Olympic basketball players of South Korea
Basketball players at the 2004 Summer Olympics
Asian Games medalists in basketball
Basketball players at the 2002 Asian Games
Basketball players at the 2006 Asian Games
Asian Games silver medalists for South Korea
Medalists at the 2002 Asian Games